Simunye Park is a multi-use stadium in Simunye, Eswatini.  It is currently used mostly for football matches and is home to the Royal Leopards of the Swazi Premier League.  The stadium has a capacity of 5,000 people.

Football venues in Eswatini